These are tables of congressional delegations from Rhode Island to the United States Senate and United States House of Representatives.

The current dean of the Rhode Island delegation is Senator Jack Reed, having served in the Senate since 1997 and in Congress since 1991.

United States Senate

U.S. House of Representatives

Current representatives

1790 - 1843: At-large seat(s)
When Rhode Island ratified the Constitution in 1790, it had one seat. After the first census, it had two seats, chosen at-large on a general ticket.

1843 - present
In 1843 the at-large seat was eliminated. Since then, Representatives have been chosen from separate districts.

Key

See also

 List of United States congressional districts
 Rhode Island's congressional districts
 Political party strength in Rhode Island

Notes

References

 Congressional Biographical Directory of the United States 1774–present
 Information from the Clerk of the U.S. House of Representatives

Politics of Rhode Island
Rhode Island
Members of the United States House of Representatives from Rhode Island
 
Congressional delegations